Wielka Sowa ("Great Owl") with a height of  is the highest peak of the Owl Mountains, a range of the Central Sudetes. The mountain is located in Dzierżoniów County, Lower Silesian Voivodeship, in south-western Poland.

Geography

The peak made up of metamorphic rocks of the Precambrian rises above the village of Walim near Dzierżoniów in the north and the Nysa Kłodzka Valley in the west. It is surrounded by the Owl Mountains Landscape Park. Its slopes are a popular skiing area in winter.

In 1906 a Bismarck tower was erected at the summit at the behest of the German authorities. Renamed several times after World War II, it recently has been restored in the course of the EU Interreg incentive program and re-opened in 2008. It is today just called wieża widokowa (observation tower) and offers a panoramic view to the Krkonoše range, to Mount Ślęża, into the Kłodzko Valley and over the Oder Basin in the north up to Wrocław on a bright day.

External links
 The Great Owl photo gallery
 Photo gallery of Wielka Sowa 
 naszesudety.pl 
 History of the observation tower 

Mountains of Poland
Dzierżoniów County